Oliver Gussenberg (born 28 October 1976 in Oldenburg) is a German judoka.

Achievements

References
 

1976 births
Living people
German male judoka
Judoka at the 2000 Summer Olympics
Judoka at the 2004 Summer Olympics
Olympic judoka of Germany
Sportspeople from Oldenburg